Abraham L. Harrison (March 4, 1867 – May 1, 1932) was an American baseball shortstop in the late 19th century, who played for predecessor teams to the Negro leagues. He played for several teams from 1885 to 1897, spending the majority of his career with the Cuban Giants.

References

External links
 and Seamheads

1867 births
1932 deaths
Cuban Giants players
Baseball players from Pennsylvania
20th-century African-American people
Baseball infielders